Jean Turnbull is a former international lawn bowls competitor for Australia.

Bowls career
She won a silver medal in the pairs with Pam Hart and a bronze medal in the fours with Hart, Connie Hicks and Mary Ormsby at the 1969 World Outdoor Bowls Championship in Sydney. She also won a silver medal in the team event (Taylor Trophy).

References

Australian female bowls players
20th-century Australian women